Malfunkshun is an alternative rock band formed in 1980 by Andrew Wood and his brother Kevin Wood. The band formed around the same time as other Washington state bands such as The U-Men (1980), Melvins (1983), Green River (1984), Soundgarden (1984) and Skin Yard (1985).

History
Bainbridge Island, Washington brothers Andrew and Kevin Wood, along with Dave Hunt and Dave Rees formed Malfunkshun, originally as a four-piece. David Hunt (1964-2009) and Dave Rees played with Malfunkshun for only one show, the former on drums and the latter on bass. After Rees and Hunt left, Andy took over bass and drummer Regan Hagar was recruited from Maggot Brains, establishing the band's definitive power trio lineup.

During performances, each band member had an alter ego.  Andrew's was L'Andrew the Love Child, Kevin was Kevinstein and Regan became Thundarr. Kevin's stage persona wasn't as carved-in-stone as Andy's or Regan's, referred to sometimes as "the Axe-Handler" and even an early Malfunkshun poster  hand-drawn by Andy Wood names him "Led Springsteen". Using makeup and flashy glam-style clothing in a nod to KISS, and other favorite bands, Malfunkshun was known for their dynamic live shows. As L'andrew, Andy was unpredictable and would wander the crowd during shows with his wireless bass, and even stop shows to eat cereal, and throw the rest out to the crowd. Andrew became increasingly involved with drugs and in 1985 he checked into drug rehab, during which time Malfunkshun was put on hold.

When Andy returned from rehab, the band started up again and contributed "With Yo' Heart (Not Yo' Hands)" and "Stars-n-You" to the Deep Six compilation by C/Z Records.  Notwithstanding their densely distorted sound, Sub Pop never took much interest in the band. Although they were beginning to gain popularity they rarely headlined their own shows.

Dissolving, but never formally disbanding, Malfunkshun took a back seat to the jam sessions Andy Wood and Regan Hagar had begun with Green River members Stone Gossard and Jeff Ament. These sessions were the beginnings of Lords Of The Wasteland, which would become Mother Love Bone after the addition of Greg Gilmore and Bruce Fairweather. Kevin formed Fire Ants in 1992 with his brother Brian, bassist Dan McDonald, and former Nirvana drummer Chad Channing.  Later Brian joined Ben Shepherd of Soundgarden, to form Hater. The brothers later formed Devilhead.  Hagar moved on, playing in Satchel, with Shawn Smith, and in Brad, also with Shawn Smith and with Stone Gossard.

A grouping of Malfunkshun demos and recordings from 1986 to 1987 were released on Stone Gossard and Regan Hagar's Loosegroove label in 1995, as Return to Olympus, which was the largest major label release of the band's material.

In 2005, a documentary entitled Malfunkshun: The Andrew Wood Story, debuted at the Seattle International Film Festival. The documentary is available on DVD in a boxed set with the reissued CD entitled Return to Olympus and the never before released Andrew Wood CD entitled Melodies and Dreams. This boxed set is a digipak set of 3 discs (1 DVD/2 CD's) entitled Malfunkshun: The Andrew Wood Story released on July 19, 2011 by Universal Music Enterprises.

On October 24, 2006, surviving Malfunkshun members Kevin Wood and Regan Hagar, with vocalist Shawn Smith and bassist Cory Kane, began writing new music using lyrics written by Andrew Wood before his death, for the release of a new album, after which they planned to go on tour. The band had originally intended to use the name Malfunkshun, soon changing it to Subfunkshun or The Subfunkshun Project, and eventually settling on From The North (Von Nord).

On February 19, 2011, Malfunkshun announced on their website that Jeff Loftis would be taking over vocals for both Malfunkshun and From the North. On March 14, 2011, Kevin and Jeff recorded the song "Jezebel Woman" and on March 19, 2011 recorded "Until the Ocean".  They have posted both songs on YouTube under the name "Malfunkshun 2011". On May 15, 2011, Malfunkshun posted on their website, that Regan officially stepped down as the drummer, and on May 24, 2011, Malfunkshun posted on their website naming Mike Stone as Regan's replacement on drums, however Miles Freeborn substituted for Stone in March 2012 and has remained the band's drummer ever since. On May 9, 2012, Malfunkshun announced on their website that Rob Day had joined the band in place of Guy McIntosh, who had briefly replaced Cory Kane on bass for the band's autumn/winter tour dates.

Members

Current members
Kevin Wood – guitar (1980-1988, 2006–present)
Jeff Stark – lead vocals (2015–present)
Bradley BT Leach – drums (2015–present)
Paul Lamb – bass guitar, Moog (2016–present)

Former members
Andrew Wood – lead vocals, bass guitar (1980–1988; died 1990)
Dave Rees – bass guitar (1980)
Dave Hunt – drums (1980; died 2009)
Regan Hagar – drums (1980–1988, 2006–2011)
Thorsten Rock – guitar (2006–2008)
Cory Kane – bass guitar (2006–2011)
Shawn Smith – lead vocals (2006–2011; died 2019)
Mike Stone – drums (2011–2012)
Guy McIntosh – bass guitar (2011–2012)
Jeff Loftis - lead vocals (2011–2013)
Rob Day – bass guitar (2012–2016)
Miles Freeborn – drums (2012–2015)
Tony West – lead vocals (2014–2015)

Timeline

Discography

Albums
Return to Olympus (Loosegroove Records, 1995).

EPs
Glow (Wammybox Records, 2021).

Compilation contributions
"With Yo' Heart (Not Yo' Hands)" and "Stars-N-You" on Deep Six (C/Z Records, 1986).
"My Only Fan" and "Shotgun Wedding" on Another Pyrrhic Victory: The Only Compilation Of Dead Seattle God Bands (C/Z Records, 1989).

References

Interviews
 Interview with Kevin Wood on Full in Bloom Music, Voted Colorado's Best, Interviews, Bios, Real Estate.
 Interviews from the movie "Malfunkshun: The Andrew Wood Story"

External links
Malfunkshun's Official Website
 [ Malfunkshun at AllMusic.com].

C/Z Records artists
Musical groups from Washington (state)
Grunge musical groups
Alternative rock groups from Washington (state)
Musical groups established in 1980
Musical groups disestablished in 1988
Musical groups reestablished in 2006
Sibling musical groups